The CAF First Round was the first stage of the qualification for the 1990 FIFA World Cup in the Confederation of African Football (CAF) zone.

Format 
Eight knockout ties were originally drawn, involving the sixteen lowest ranked African countries.

  v 
  v 
  v 
  v 
  v 
  v 
  v 
  v 

Lesotho, Rwanda and Togo all withdrew after the draw was made. This meant their scheduled opponents – Zimbabwe, Zambia and Gabon – all advanced by walkover.

The winners of each tie advanced to the Second Round, where they were joined by the eight highest ranked African teams who received a bye in the first round.

Matches

Angola won 2 – 1 on aggregate and advanced to the Second Round.
 

Zimbabwe advanced to the Second Round after Lesotho withdrew.
 

Zambia advanced to the Second Round after Rwanda withdrew.
 

Malawi won 3 – 2 on aggregate and advanced to the Second Round.
 

Libya won 3 – 2 on aggregate and advanced to the Second Round.
 

Liberia won 2 – 0 on aggregate and advanced to the Second Round.
 

Tunisia won 5 – 3 on aggregate and advanced to the Second Round.
 

Gabon advanced to the Second Round after Togo withdrew.

External links
 World Cup 1990 qualifications - Africa ar RSSSF.com

1
Qual
Egypt at the 1990 FIFA World Cup